An incantation bowl, also known as a demon bowl, devil-trap bowl, or magic bowl, is a form of early protective magic found in what is now Iraq and Iran. Produced in the Middle East during late antiquity from the sixth to eighth centuries, particularly in Upper Mesopotamia and Syria, the bowls were usually inscribed in a spiral, beginning from the rim and moving toward the center. Most are inscribed in Jewish Babylonian Aramaic.

The bowls were buried face down and were meant to capture demons. They were commonly placed under the threshold, courtyards, in the corner of the homes of the recently deceased and in cemeteries.

The majority of Mesopotamia's population were either Christian, Manichaean, Mandaean, Jewish or adherents of the ancient Babylonian religion, all of whom spoke Aramaic dialects. Zoroastrians who spoke Persian also lived here. Mandaeans and Jews each used their own Aramaic variety, although very closely related.  A subcategory of incantation bowls are those used in Jewish and Christian magical practice. (See Jewish magical papyri for context) The majority of recovered incantation bowls were written in Jewish Aramaic. These are followed in frequency by the Mandaic language and then Syriac. A handful of bowls have been discovered that were written in Arabic or Persian. An estimated 10% of incantation bowls were not written in any real language but pseudo-script. They are thought to be forgeries by illiterate “scribes” and sold to illiterate clients. The bowls are thought to have been regularly commissioned across religious lines.

Archaeological finds
To date only around 2000 incantation bowls have been registered as archaeological finds, but since they are widely dug up in the Middle East, there may be tens of thousands in the hands of private collectors and traders. Aramaic incantation bowls from Sasanian Mesopotamia are an important source for studying the everyday beliefs of Jews, Christians, Mandaeans, Manichaeans, Zoroastrians and pagans on the eve of the early Muslim conquests.

In Judaism

A subcategory of incantation bowls are those used in Jewish and Christian magical practice. Aramaic incantation bowls are an important source of knowledge about Jewish magical practices, particularly the nearly eighty surviving Jewish incantation bowls from Babylon during the rule by the Sasanian Empire (226-636), primarily from the Jewish diaspora settlement in Nippur. These bowls were used in magic to protect against evil influences such as the evil eye, Lilith, and Bagdana. These bowls could be used by any member of the community, and almost every house excavated in the Jewish settlement in Nippur had such bowls buried in them.

The inscriptions often include scriptural quotes and quotes from rabbinic texts. The text on incantation bowls is the only written material documenting Jewish language and religion recovered from the period around the writing of the Babylonian Talmud. Scholars say that the use of rabbinic texts demonstrates that they were considered to have supernatural power comparable to that of biblical quotes. The bowls often refer to themselves as "amulets" and the Talmud discusses the use of amulets and magic to drive away demons.

In Christianity

At the same period and in the same region, Christian incantation bowls are also found, often in Syriac, which is a dialect of the Aramaic language.

In Mandaeism

There are also many incantation bowls written in Mandaic.

See also
Mandaic lead rolls
List of Mandaean texts
Demons in Mandaeism

References

Further reading
 Bhayro, Siam, James Nathan Ford, Dan Levene, and Ortal-Paz Saar, Aramaic Magic Bowls in the Vorderasiatisches Museum in Berlin. Descriptive List and Edition of Selected Texts [Magical and Religious Literature of Late Antiquity 7], 2018.
 Ford, James Nathan and Matthew Morgenstern, Aramaic Incantation Bowls in Museum Collections. Volume One: The Frau Professor Hilprecht Collection of Babylonian Antiquities, Jena [Magical and Religious Literature of Late Antiquity 8], 2019.
 Gioia, Ted, "Healing songs", Format: Book, Electronic Resource  2006
 Gordon, Cyrus H. “Aramaic Incantation Bowls.” Orientalia, vol. 10, 1941, pp. 116–141. JSTOR, JSTOR, www.jstor.org/stable/43582631.
 Harari, Yuval, "Jewish Magic before the Rise of Kabbala", 2017.
 Juusola, Hannu, "Linguistic peculiarities in the Aramaic magic bowl texts", Format: Book, Electronic Resource, 1999.
 Levene, Dan, "A corpus of magic bowls : Incantation texts in Jewish Aramaic from late antiquity", format: Book, Electronic Resource, 2003.
 McCullough, William Stewart, "Jewish and Mandaean incantation bowls in the Royal Ontario Museum", 1967.
 Montgomery, James A., "Aramaic Incantation Texts from Nippur", 1913.
 Müller-Kessler, Christa, "Die Zauberschalentexte in der Hilprecht-Sammlung, Jena und weitere Nippur-Texte anderer Sammlungen", 2005.
 Naveh, Joseph and Shaked, Shaul, "Amulets and magic bowls : Aramaic incantations of late antiquity", 1985.
 Naveh, Joseph and Shaked, Shaul, “Magic Spells and Formulae : Aramaic Incantations of Late Antiquity", 1993.
 Kedar Dorit, Who wrote the Incantation Bowls? PhD Diss. (Freie Universität Berlin) 2018.

External links

 Translation of an incantation bowl
 Rare Magic Inscription on Human Skull Biblical Archaeology Review
 How Aggressive is Aramaic Aggressive Magic. A paper by PhD candidate Chaya-Vered Dürrschnabel

Demons in Judaism

Iranian pottery
Magic items
Medieval Upper Mesopotamia
Objects believed to protect from evil
Syrian pottery
Language and mysticism
Mandaean texts
Aramaic texts